Liu Guini (born 1982) is a Chinese team handball player. Playing on the Chinese national team, she competed at the 2008 Summer Olympics in Beijing, where China placed sixth.

References

External links

1982 births
Living people
Olympic handball players of China
Chinese female handball players
Handball players at the 2008 Summer Olympics
Handball players from Shandong
Handball players at the 2006 Asian Games
Asian Games competitors for China
21st-century Chinese women